F/A-18 Hornet 3.0 is a video game developed and published by Graphic Simulations for the Macintosh and Windows in 1997.

Gameplay
F/A-18 Hornet 3.0 adds to the mission set from version 2.0, an interactive training guide, and true radar masking.

Development
The game was released for Mac computers in October 1993.

Reception
Next Generation rated it three stars out of five, and stated that "Hornet 3.0 won't make your jaw drop, but it won't leave you feeling ripped off either.  With just enough new features to justify the incremental version number increase, it's worth the time of Mac flight fans."

Reviews
Game.EXE #4 (Apr 1997)
Computer Gaming World #156 (Jul 1997)
PC Zone #55 (1997 October)
PC Games - Sep, 1997
GameSpot - Oct 29, 1997
Mac Addict - Aug, 1997

References

1997 video games
Classic Mac OS games
Combat flight simulators
Video games developed in the United States
Windows games